The Halton County Radial Railway is a working museum of electric streetcars, other railway vehicles, buses and trolleybuses. It is operated by the Ontario Electric Railway Historical Association (OERHA). It is focused primarily on the history of the Toronto Transit Commission (TTC) and its predecessor, the Toronto Transportation Commission, Its collection includes PCC, Peter Witt, CLRV and ALRV, and earlier cars from the Toronto streetcar system as well as G-series and M-series Toronto subway cars.

The museum is open to the public, with rides on many of its vehicles. It is located between the villages of Rockwood and Campbellville in Milton, Ontario, Canada, along part of the Toronto Suburban Railway's former right-of-way. Vehicles from other systems must be altered to accommodate the tracks, and cars intended for third-rail power must be reconfigured for use with overhead wire. In 1889, electric railway service on routes radiating from Toronto, Ontario began. An Ontario Historical Plaque was erected at the Halton County Radial Railway Museum by the province to commemorate the Radial Railways' role in Ontario's heritage. 
Museum Peter Witt streetcars can be seen in the 2005 film Cinderella Man on the streets of Toronto to give it a 1930s New York City appearance.

History
The Halton County Radial Railway and the OERHA was formed in 1953 by a group of men who wanted to save Toronto Transit Commission streetcar 1326 from being sent to the scrap yard. After the donation of this streetcar, the dream grew. Land that used to be a part of the Toronto Suburban Railway in Nassagaweya Township was acquired, and subsequently, a number of other street and radial cars were eventually rescued. The museum's grand opening took place in 1972.

Since the beginning, the vision of the HCRR was to inform, educate and inspire the public about the electric railway history of Ontario and Canada. Today, the museum displays and operates a variety of historic streetcars, radial cars and work cars, and maintains a collection of photographs, memorabilia and archival materials. The oldest rail car in the collection dates from the late 1800s.

Gallery

TTC Collection
 TTC CLRV streetcars 4003 (built by SIG), 4010, 4039, 4040, 4053 and 4178; acquired 2019–2020.
 TTC ALRV streetcar 4204; acquired 2019 and one of two last ALRV operating in 2019
 TTC G1 subway cars 5098 and 5099
 TTC MLW M1 subway cars 5300 and 5301
 TTC CCF-built Peter Witt streetcar 2894, 2424 and 2786, 2984
 TTC PCC streetcars CCF-built 4000 (A1), 4386 (A6), 4426 (A7), 4600 (A8 / A15), 4611 and 4618 (A8 / A15); 4684 is an A12 St Louis Car built ex-Louisville Railway #509 and ex-Cleveland Transit System #4259

See also

 Canadian Pacific Railway
 Hamilton Street Railway
 History of rail transport in Canada
 List of heritage railways in Canada
 List of museums in Canada
 Northern Ontario Railway Museum
 Toronto radial lines
 Toronto streetcar track gauge
 Toronto subway track gauge
 Toronto Transit Commission

References

External links

 Official web site of The Halton County Radial Railway

Culture of the Regional Municipality of Halton
Heritage railways in Ontario
Rail transport in Milton, Ontario
Railway museums in Ontario
Streetcars in Canada
Rail transport in the Regional Municipality of Halton
History of rail transport in the Regional Municipality of Halton
Museums in the Regional Municipality of Halton
4 ft 10⅞ in gauge railways
Tram museums